Miletus ware is a type of pottery that was produced in various locations in Anatolia between the late 14th and mid 15th centuries. The pottery type was excavated in quantity in the 1930s by Friedrich Sarre at Balat, Didim, ancient Miletus, hence the ware's name. It has long been realized that this pottery type was not produced at Balat, but in other towns such as İznik, the main centre, and Kütahya.

Miletus ware used red clay as a base, covered with white slip, with simple designs in blue, turquoise and purple, and a clear lead glaze on top.  The shapes were mostly bowls or deep dishes.  The painted designs often incorporated "sunburst" and vegetal patterns.

Miletus ware was superseded in the later 15th century by Iznik pottery, with the introduction of white bodies instead of the red clays. However, there is a certain continuity in the colours used for the decoration.

Gallery

Notes

References

.
Blair, Sheila, and Bloom, Jonathan M., The Art and Architecture of Islam, 1250-1800, 1995, Yale University Press Pelican History of Art, 

History of ceramics
Turkish art
Islamic pottery